Jimmy Allan may refer to:

Jimmy Allan (cricketer) (1932–2005), Scottish first-class cricketer
Jimmy Allan (footballer, born 1896) (1896–1982), Scottish football player and manager (Dundee United)
Jimmy Allan (footballer, born 1953), Scottish footballer (Swindon Town)

See also
Jim Allan (disambiguation)
James Allan (disambiguation)
James Allen (disambiguation), including Jimmy Allen
Jimmie Allen, American country singer